Miller Pipeline, headquartered in Indianapolis, Indiana, United States, is a natural gas distribution, water/wastewater, and transmission pipeline and utility contracting company. The company provides a range of pipeline contracting and rehabilitation services for natural gas, liquids, water and wastewater pipelines. In the fall of 2006, Vectren purchased Duke Energy's interest in Miller Pipeline, making it a subsidiary of Vectren. In 2019, CenterPoint Energy merged with Vectren. In February 2020, CenterPoint announced it was selling Miller Pipeline and Minnesota Limited to Atlanta-based PowerTeam Services. CenterPoint Energy sold Miller Pipeline and Minnesota Limited (collectively, "MVerge") to PowerTeam Services for $850 million in cash, subject to customary purchase price adjustments. Net proceeds of the sale were used to repay a portion of outstanding CenterPoint Energy debt. In 2019, PowerTeam Services rebranded to Artera Services.

History 
Miller Pipeline was founded in 1953 (as a private company) as Don W. Miller, Incorporated in Green Springs, Ohio. In 1961, they branched out to Indianapolis and have since grown to include three divisions with approximately 3,800 construction professionals.

In 2011, Miller Pipeline acquired Minnesota Limited, which is headquartered in Big Lake, Minnesota and was founded in 1966. Minnesota Limited is one of the largest northern Midwest contractors in the industry and focuses primarily on transmission pipeline construction and maintenance.

References 

Natural gas companies of the United States
Natural gas pipeline companies
Companies based in Indiana